Fedrizziidae is a family of mites in the order Mesostigmata.

Species
Fedrizziidae contains three genera, with 31 recognized species:

 Genus Fedrizzia G.Canestrini, 1884
 Fedrizzia abradoalves Seeman, 2007
 Fedrizzia bornemisszai Womersley, 1959
 Fedrizzia derricki Womersley, 1959
 Fedrizzia gilloglyi Seeman, 2007
 Fedrizzia gloriosa Berlese, 1910
 Fedrizzia grossipes G.Canestrini, 1884
 Fedrizzia latus (Schweizer, 1956)
 Fedrizzia oudemansi Womersley, 1959
 Fedrizzia parvipilus Seeman, 2007
 Fedrizzia sellnicki Womersley, 1959
 Fedrizzia unospina Karg, 1997
 Genus Neofedrizzia Womersley, 1959
 Neofedrizzia bicornis Karg, 1997
 Neofedrizzia brooksi Womersley, 1959
 Neofedrizzia bunyas Seeman, 2007
 Neofedrizzia camini Womersley, 1959
 Neofedrizzia canestrinii Womersley, 1959
 Neofedrizzia cynota Womersley, 1959
 Neofedrizzia gayi Womersley, 1959
 Neofedrizzia gordoni Seeman, 2007
 Neofedrizzia gorirossiae Womersley, 1959
 Neofedrizzia helenae Seeman, 2007
 Neofedrizzia imparmentum Seeman, 2007
 Neofedrizzia janae Seeman, 2007
 Neofedrizzia laevis (Canestrini, 1884)
 Neofedrizzia leonilae Rosario & Hunter, 1984
 Neofedrizzia lepas Seeman, 2007
 Neofedrizzia sulawesi Seeman, 2007
 Neofedrizzia tani Pope & Chernoff, 1979
 Neofedrizzia tragardhi Womersley, 1959
 Neofedrizzia vidua Womersley, 1959
 Genus Parafedrizzia Womersley, 1959
 Parafedrizzia buloloensis Womersley, 1959

References

Mesostigmata
Acari families